Bauhaus is a German pan-European retail chain offering products for home improvement, gardening, and workshop. The name contains the German words bauen (to build) and Haus (house), but also alludes to the modernist Bauhaus school and the company's founder and owner, the German billionaire Heinz-Georg Baus.

Its first store opened in Mannheim, then West Germany in 1960.

It has 250 stores and franchises across Europe, including Austria, Bulgaria, Czech Republic, Croatia, Denmark, Estonia, Finland, Hungary, Iceland, Luxembourg, Netherlands, Norway, Slovakia, Slovenia, Spain, Sweden, Switzerland, and Turkey.

History

History 

The company was founded by Heinz-Georg Baus in 1960 based on the American model. It was the first DIY store in Germany. "Anyone looking for tools or building materials had to go from specialist shops to other specialist shops. With its new-age concept Bauhaus enabled a more relaxed way of shopping, with everything available under one roof."

The first trade shop to have a sales area of 250 m² was in Mannheim city centre, in "Quadrat U3". In addition to its range of roughly 25,000 products, which were originally available in self-service, Bauhaus offered its customers customisation for wooden panels, a delivery service and a customer car park directly in front of the entrance.

Branches of the Bauhaus in Mannheim opened in Heidelberg and Karlsruhe, then in 1968 the first store opened in West Berlin. By the end of the 1960s there were 10 branches and in the 1970s there were already three times as many. From the start of the 1980s to the end of the 1990s this expansion was concentrated wholly on Germany, with 60 new branches being opened. The 100th branch opened in 1989 in the town of Flensburg.

The first Bauhaus outside of Germany opened in Austria, where in 1972 the first state owned company was founded. Following this in 1988 the Scandinavian industry officially opened in Denmark and in 1993 the first Bauhaus in Eastern Europe opened in the Czech Republic. As of January 2015 Bauhaus is operating in 19 different countries with over 250 branches. To this day (January 2015) the German branch of Bauhaus (Service Center Deutschland) is based in Mannheim. 

At the start of 2000 Bauhaus were in talks with the American DIY chain The Home Depot, which however ended without a result. In 2007 the Federal Court of Justice of Germany decided that the decision made by the Higher Regional Court of Hamburg would be rescinded, thus Bauhaus was forbidden from using a brand with the appendix "The Home Store".

At the end of 2004 Bauhaus as well as Praktiker, withdrew from the trade group "Deutsche Heimwerker-, Bau- und Gartenfachmärkte" (literally, the German DIY and Garden Stores trade group). Bauhaus also does not belong to an employer's association, so it is not governed by a tariff commitment. Ten of the 150 Bauhaus stores in Germany have a works council.

At the end of November 2013, it was announced that Bauhaus wanted to take over 24 Max Bahr branches, who have around 1300 employees working for them. Max Bahr used to belong to Praktiker and declared itself insolvent on 25 July 2013 because of Praktiker's insolvency. Alongside the 20 Max Bahr sites, four Praktiker sites were added.

On March 30, 2020, it was announced that Bauhaus would take over the Bonn leisure markets of Knauber KG. The acquisition took place on July 1, 2020.

Controversy
In 2009, Monitor, an investigative German TV format produced by ARD, revealed that the Bauhaus management used the term "contaminated by works councils" to refer to chain stores with an active works council representing employees' interests. Subsequently, betriebsratsverseucht was chosen as the German Un-Word of the Year by a jury of linguistic scholars, who thus criticized the presumed inhuman attitude of the Bauhaus management towards its subordinates.

References

Bauhaus homepage
FIBT website featuring Bauhaus as one of the sponsors
website featuring latest Bauhaus publications

Hardware stores
Retail companies of Switzerland
Retail companies established in 1960
1960 establishments in West Germany
Multinational companies headquartered in Switzerland
German companies established in 1960